

153001–153100 

|-id=078
| 153078 Giovale ||  || John P. Giovale (born 1943), chairman of the Lowell Observatory Advisory Board during 2001–2007 || 
|}

153101–153200 

|-bgcolor=#f2f2f2
| colspan=4 align=center | 
|}

153201–153300 

|-id=284
| 153284 Frieman ||  || Joshua Frieman (born 1959), American astronomer and contributor to the Sloan Digital Sky Survey || 
|-id=289
| 153289 Rebeccawatson ||  || Rebecca Watson (born 1980), American radio, blog, and Internet (The Skeptics' Guide to the Universe) science advocate || 
|-id=298
| 153298 Paulmyers ||  || PZ Myers (born 1957), American associate professor of biology and public educator, author of the blog Pharyngula || 
|}

153301–153400 

|-
| 153301 Alissamearle ||  || Alissa M. Earle (born 1991) completed her PhD research on Pluto's long-term seasonal cycles at the Massachusetts Institute of Technology while serving as a composition analysis team member for the New Horizons mission to Pluto. || 
|-id=333
| 153333 Jeanhugues ||  || Jean-Hugues Blanc (born 1971), French member of the Astronomical Society of Montpellier and astronomer at the discovery Pises Observatory || 
|}

153401–153500 

|-bgcolor=#f2f2f2
| colspan=4 align=center | 
|}

153501–153600 

|-bgcolor=#f2f2f2
| colspan=4 align=center | 
|}

153601–153700 

|-id=686
| 153686 Pathall ||  || Patrick Hall (born 1968), Canadian-American astronomer with the Sloan Digital Sky Survey || 
|}

153701–153800 

|-bgcolor=#f2f2f2
| colspan=4 align=center | 
|}

153801–153900 

|-bgcolor=#f2f2f2
| colspan=4 align=center | 
|}

153901–154000 

|-bgcolor=#f2f2f2
| colspan=4 align=center | 
|}

References 

153001-154000